St. John of the Cross Episcopal Church, Rectory and Cemetery is a historic Episcopal church complex located at Bristol, Elkhart County, Indiana.  The church was built between 1843 and 1847, and is a one-story, Gothic Revival style frame building.  It has a projecting bell tower with octagonal roof and lancet windows.  The associated rectory was built in 1830, and is a -story, rectangular, Greek Revival style frame dwelling.  The complex also includes the contributing church cemetery.

It was added to the National Register of Historic Places in 1980.

References

Episcopal church buildings in Indiana
19th-century Episcopal church buildings
Churches on the National Register of Historic Places in Indiana
Greek Revival houses in Indiana
Gothic Revival church buildings in Indiana
Houses completed in 1830
Churches completed in 1847
Churches in Elkhart County, Indiana
National Register of Historic Places in Elkhart County, Indiana
1847 establishments in Indiana